Mackellar Inlet is an inlet forming the northwestern head of Admiralty Bay, at King George Island in the South Shetland Islands. It was probably named by the Fourth French Antarctic Expedition under Jean-Baptiste Charcot, who charted Admiralty Bay in December 1909. Wegger Peak stands on the west side of the inlet entrance.

References

Inlets of Antarctica
Bodies of water of King George Island (South Shetland Islands)
Bodies of water of the South Shetland Islands